The 5th Indian Infantry Division was an infantry division of the Indian Army during World War II that fought in several theatres of war and was nicknamed the "Ball of Fire". It was one of the few Allied divisions to fight against three different armies - the Italian, German and Japanese armies.

The division was raised in 1939 in Secunderabad with two brigades under command. In 1940, the 5th Indian Division moved to Sudan and took under command three British infantry battalions stationed there and was reorganised into three brigades of three battalions each. The division fought in the East African Campaign in Eritrea and Ethiopia during 1940 and 1941, thence moving to Egypt, Cyprus and Iraq. In 1942, the division was heavily engaged in the Western Desert Campaign and the First Battle of El Alamein. From late 1943 to the Japanese surrender in August 1945, it fought continuously from India through the length of Burma. After the end of the war, it was the first unit into Singapore and then fought pro-Independence forces in Eastern Java.

History

The division was raised at Secunderabad in India from the Deccan District Headquarters, with two brigades of three Indian infantry battalions each. It moved to the Sudan in 1940 and was joined by three British infantry battalions already there. The division was reorganised into three brigades each with one British and two Indian battalions (as was the prevailing custom).

The divisional sign of a red circle on a black background, which gave the division its nickname, was selected after the first selection of a boar's head was deemed offensive to Muslim soldiers and every other animal suggested had already been selected by other newly raised divisions.

Between 1940 and 1941, the 5th Division was involved in the campaign in East Africa. After periods in Egypt, Cyprus and Syria, by 1942 it was involved in the fighting in the Western Desert of North Africa and the withdrawal of the Allied troops to El Alamein. By late 1943, the 5th Division had been shipped to India and took part in the campaign in Burma, initially deployed to the Arakan front. After the Japanese had been defeated in the Battle of the Admin Box, the division was airlifted north to take part in the Battle of Imphal and the Battle of Kohima. Thereafter, the division was almost constantly involved in the advance through central Burma until fighting ended with the Japanese surrender in August 1945. After the end of the war, it was the first unit into Singapore and then fought pro-Independence forces in Eastern Java while protecting the recovery of Allied prisoners of war who had been incarcerated there.

Lord Louis Mountbatten wrote in his memoirs paying tribute to the division whose record was "second to none", saying

East African Campaign

The 5th Indian Division, under the command of Major-General Lewis Heath and comprising only two brigades at the time, was sent from India to the Sudan to reinforce the British forces there under Lieutenant-General Sir William Platt which had been attacked by Italian forces in Eritrea, at the time part of the Italian East African Empire. On 10 June 1940, before the arrival of the 5th Division, Platt had only three infantry battalions and the machine-gun companies of the Sudan Defence Force.

The 5th Division started to arrive in the Sudan in early September 1940 and absorbed Platt's three British infantry battalions (the 1st Battalion, Worcestershire Regiment, the 1st Battalion, Essex Regiment and the 2nd Battalion, West Yorkshire Regiment,) and formed a third infantry brigade. After these rearrangements, the division consisted of the 9th, 10th and 29th Indian Infantry Brigades.

For the next three months, the division was involved in a series of aggressive skirmishing operations to keep the Italian forces off balance and confused as to Platt's longer-term intentions. In early 1941, Platt's forces were further augmented by the 4th Indian Infantry Division, rushed from the Western Desert after the breakthrough during Operation Compass, and an attack was launched into Eritrea on 18 January. The climax of the campaign was the Battle of Keren, a fiercely fought series of engagements against superior numbers, which ended with victory for Platt's forces on 1 April.

After Keren, the 4th Indian Division was withdrawn to Cairo and the 5th Indian Division continued the campaign in Eritrea, finally joining up with elements of Lieutenant-General Alan Cunningham's forces, which had advanced north from Kenya to capture Italian Somaliland and the Italian capital of Addis Ababa in Ethiopia, to take the surrender of Prince Amedeo, Duke of Aosta, the Italian Viceroy, at Amba Alagi.

North Africa and the Middle East
9 and 10 Brigades of 5 Indian Division were newly stationed around Tobruk when Rommel's offensive against the Gazala Line commenced at the end of May 1942. Fresh to the desert, just recently equipped with obsolete anti tank guns and poor transport, they were ordered to counterattack (Operation Aberdeen) the German breakthrough. The operation was badly mismanaged by the Corps commander; tank and artillery support failed to materialise and casualties were crippling – every one of the West Yorks officers who participated was killed or wounded. The remnants were withdrawn first to Mersa Matruh then to the rudimentary defences at Alamein, where, reformed, they garrisoned the line, formed mobile 'Jock columns' and participated in successful counterattacks in the First Battle of El Alamein in July. After the Battle of Alam Halfa in August, they were withdrawn to garrison duties in Iraq before being shipped to Burma in mid-1943.

Burma campaign

At the end of 1943, the division began to take part in the Burma Campaign. It was facing the Japanese 55th Division on the coastal flank of the Arakan front. The defeat of the Japanese 55th Division in the Battle of the Admin Box, to which a large share of the credit must go to the 5th Indian Infantry Division, was the first big victory against the Japanese since they had invaded Burma two years previously. From the victory in the Arakan sector, the 5th Indian Infantry Division was air-lifted to the central front. 161 Brigade joined XXXIII Corps, which was beginning to arrive at Dimapur, and fought in the Battle of Kohima; the remainder of the division reinforced IV Corps, whose land victory at Kohima and Imphal, in which the division played an important part, proved to be the turning-point of the Burma Campaign. Except for one period of rest and reorganization, the Indian 5th Division continued to fight and to advance throughout the rest of the war, and took part in the final thrust by IV Corps down to Rangoon.

Service after Burma
After service in Burma the division was the first unit to be landed in Singapore as part of Operation Tiderace and was later sent to Java as part of the Allied occupation of the Dutch East Indies. It saw heavy fighting during the Battle of Surabaya in November 1945.

Post 1947

After the Sino-Indian War, the division was re-raised as a mountain division and is currently headquartered at Tenga, in Arunachal Pradesh. Units of the erstwhile wartime division were absorbed into Jammu Division during the India-Pakistan War of 1947-1948; the Jammu Division was later renamed as the 26th Infantry Division.

Formation during World War II
General Officer Commanding:
 Major-General Lewis Heath (Jul 1940 – Apr 1941)
 Major-General Mosley Mayne (Apr 1941 – May 1942)
 Brigadier Claude M. Vallentin (May 1942)
 Major-General H.R. Briggs (May 1942 – Jul 1944)
 Major-General Geoffrey Evans (Jul – Sep 1944)
 Brigadier Robert Mansergh (Sep 1944)
 Major-General Cameron Nicholson (Sep 1944)
 Major-General Dermot Warren (Sep 1944 – Feb 1945)
 Brigadier Joseph A Salomons (Feb 1945)
 Major-General Robert Mansergh (Feb – Aug 1945)

Headquarters
 1st Duke of York's Own Lancers (Skinner's Horse) (Divisional Reconnaissance Regiment) (to April 1942)
 The Guides Cavalry (10th Queen Victoria's Own Frontier Force) (from 1942 to ?)
 Royal Artillery
Commanders divisional artillery:
 Brigadier Claude M. Vallentin (Jul 1940 – Jun 1942)
 Brigadier Robert Mansergh (Jun 1942 – Sep 1944)
 Brigadier Geoffrey B.J. Kellie (Sep 1944 – Jun 1945)
 Brigadier R.G. Loder-Symonds (Jun – Aug 1945)
 HQ
 4th Field Regiment, Royal Artillery
 28th Field Regiment, Royal Artillery
 144th Field Regiment, Royal Artillery
 56th (King's Own) Anti-Tank Regiment, Royal Artillery
 24th Indian Mountain Regiment, Indian Artillery
 Indian Engineers: Sappers and Miners
 2nd and 74 Field Companies, King George V's Own Bengal Sappers and Miners
 20 Field Company, Royal Bombay Sappers and Miners
 44 Field Park Company, Queen Victoria's Own Madras Sappers and Miners
 5th Indian Division Signals
 Machine Gun Battalion, 17th Dogra Regiment

9th Indian Infantry Brigade
Commanders:
 Brigadier Theophilus J. Ponting (Sep 1939)
 Brigadier Mosley Mayne (Sep 1939 – Feb 1941)
 Brigadier Frank Messervy (Feb – Apr 1941)
 Brigadier Bernard Campbell Fletcher (Apr 1941 – Jul 1942)
 Brigadier William H. Langran (Jul 1942 – Jan 1944)
 Lieutenant-Colonel Joseph A. Salomons (Jan – Feb 1944)
 Brigadier Geoffrey Evans (Feb 1944)
 Brigadier Joseph A. Salomons (Feb 1944 – Mar 1945)
 Lieutenant-Colonel K. Bayley (Mar 1945)
 Brigadier Hubert G.L. Brain (Mar – Aug 1945)
 HQ
 2nd Battalion, West Yorkshire Regiment
 3rd Battalion, 5th Mahratta Light Infantry (1940–1942)
 3rd Battalion, 9th Jat Regiment (1942–1946)
 3rd Royal Battalion, 12th Frontier Force Regiment (1940–1942)
 3rd Battalion, 14th Punjab Regiment (1942–1946)

10th Indian Infantry Brigade (1940–1942)
Commanders:
 Brigadier Hugh R.C. Lane (Sep 1939)
 Brigadier William Slim (Sep 1939 – Jan 1941)
 Lieutenant-Colonel Bernard Campbell Fletcher (Jan – Mar 1941)
 Brigadier Thomas "Pete" Rees (Mar 1941 – Mar 1942)
 Brigadier Charles Hamilton Boucher (Mar – Jun 1942)
 Brigadier Arthur Holworthy (Jul – Oct 1942)
 Brigadier John A. Finlay (Oct 1942 – Feb 1944)
 Brigadier Terence N. Smith (Feb 1944 – Aug 1945)
 HQ
 1st Battalion, Essex Regiment
 2nd Battalion, Highland Light Infantry
 4th Battalion, 10th Baluch Regiment
 3rd Battalion, 18th Royal Garhwal Rifles
 2nd Battalion, 4th Prince of Wales's Own Gurkha Rifles

29th Indian Infantry Brigade (1940–1942)
Commanders:
 Brigadier John Charles Oakes Marriott (Oct 1940 – Oct 1941)
 Brigadier Denys Whitehorn Reid (Oct 1941 – Jun 1942)
 HQ
 1st Battalion, Worcestershire Regiment
 3rd Battalion, 2nd Punjab Regiment
 1st Battalion, 5th Mahratta Light Infantry
 6th Royal Battalion, 13th Frontier Force Rifles

123rd Indian Infantry Brigade (1942–1946)
Commanders:
 Brigadier Arthur Verney Hammond (Jun 1942 – Nov 1943)
 Brigadier Thomas John Willoughby Winterton (Nov 1943 – Feb 1944)
 Brigadier Geoffrey Evans(Feb – Jul 1944)
 Brigadier Eric J. Denholm-Young (Jul 1944 – Aug 1945)
 HQ
 2nd Battalion, Suffolk Regiment
 2nd Battalion, 1st Punjab Regiment
 3rd Battalion, 2nd Punjab Regiment
 1st Battalion, 17th Dogra Regiment
 3rd Battalion, 9th Gurkha Rifles

161st Indian Infantry Brigade (1942–1946)
Commanders:
 Brigadier William Donovan Stamer (Nov 1941 – May 1942)
 Brigadier Francis E.C. Hughes (May – Jul 1942)
 Lieutenant-Colonel D Barker (Jul 1942 – Jul 1943)
 Brigadier Dermot Warren (Jul 1943 – Sep 1944)
 Brigadier Robert G.C. Poole (Sep 1944 – Mar 1945)
 Brigadier E.H.W. "Harry" Grimshaw CB CBE DSO (Mar – Aug 1945)
 HQ
 4th Battalion, Queen's Own Royal West Kent Regiment
 1st Battalion, 1st Punjab Regiment
 4th Battalion, 7th Rajput Regiment
 3rd Battalion, 4th Prince of Wales's Own Gurkha Rifles
 2nd Field Company, KGVO Bengal Sappers and Miners

Support units
 Royal Indian Army Service Corps
 15th, 17th and 29th M.T. Companies
 20th, 60th, 74th and 82nd Animal Transport Companies (Mule)
 238th, 239th and 240th GP Transport Companies
 Composite Issue Units
 Medical Services
 I.M.S-R.A.M.C-I.M.D-I.H.C-I.A.M.C
 10th, 21st, 45th and 75th Indian Field Ambulances
 5th Indian Division Provost Unit
 Indian Army Ordnance Corps
 5th Indian Division Sub Park
 Indian Electrical and Mechanical Engineers
 112th, 113th and 123rd Infantry Workshop Companies
 5th Indian Division Recovery Company

Assigned brigades
All these brigades were assigned or attached to the division at some time during World War II:
 7th Indian Infantry Brigade
 9th Indian Infantry Brigade
 10th Indian Infantry Brigade
 29th Indian Infantry Brigade
 5th Indian Infantry Brigade
 1st South African Infantry Brigade
 British 161st Infantry Brigade
 161st Indian Infantry Brigade
 11th Indian Infantry Brigade
 1st Free French Infantry Brigade
 2nd Free French Infantry Brigade
 18th Indian Infantry Brigade
 7th Armoured Brigade
 123rd Indian Infantry Brigade
 89th Indian Infantry Brigade
 Lushai Brigade
 33rd Indian Infantry Brigade

See also
 Order of Battle, East African Campaign

Notes

References

Further reading

External links
 5 Indian Infantry Division
 British Military History – British Troops in The Sudan 1930–47

Indian World War II divisions
British Indian Army divisions
Divisions of the Indian Army
Military units and formations established in 1939
History of the Bengal Sappers
Military units and formations of the British Empire in World War II
D
Military units and formations in British Somaliland in World War II
Military units and formations disestablished in 1945